The Elaho River is a c.70 km long river beginning in the Coast Mountains northwest of the towns of Whistler and Pemberton, British Columbia. It is a tributary of the Squamish River and is known for its whitewater rafting and kayaking as well as for the intense alpine scenery lining its route.

The Elaho is much larger than the Squamish River when it meets with it. The Elaho is often subject to flash flooding.

Course 
The Elaho River originates at the outlet of an unnamed lake fed directly by the Elaho Glacier. The river starts off by flowing southeast for about 10.2 miles until its confluence with Marlow Creek, which flows from the Pemberton Icefield. The river turns south here and flows south here about 12.6 to its confluence with its largest tributary, Clendinning Creek. Between Marlow Creek and Clendinning Creek, the river flows through spectacular Elaho Canyon, a popular whitewater rafting section. From the Clendinning Creek confluence, the river continues south for another 8.9 km to its confluence with Sims Creek, its second largest tributary. After Sims Creek, the river turns southeast for about 21.4 km until its confluence with the Squamish.

Tributaries 
While Clendinning and Sims Creeks are the Elaho’s largest tributaries, the Elaho has many other smaller tributaries as well:

Moose Pasture Creek
Marlow Creek
Jauques Pierre Creek
Cesna Creek
Lava Creek
Sundown Creek
Jarvis Creek
Blakeney Creek
Bierman Creek
Ponor Creek 
Limelite Creek 
Maude Fricket Creek
Shadow Creek
Carol Creek

See also
List of British Columbia rivers

References 

Canyons and gorges of British Columbia
Rivers of the Pacific Ranges
Lillooet Land District
New Westminster Land District